The men's long jump event at the 1987 Pan American Games was held in Indianapolis, United States on 14 and 16 August.

Medalists

Results

Qualification

Final

References

Athletics at the 1987 Pan American Games
1987